The Svetlana-class cruiser''' was the first class of light cruisers built for the Imperial Russian Navy (IRN) during the 1910s. Construction was interrupted by World War I, the Russian Revolution and the Russian Civil War. Only Svetlana of the quartet was completed by the Soviet Union as a cruiser, two were converted to oil tankers, and the remaining ship was scrapped without being completed.Svetlana, now renamed Profintern, became fully operational in 1928 and was transferred to the Black Sea Fleet the following year. The ship was renamed Krasnyi Krim in 1939 and supported Soviet troops during the Black Sea Campaigns during World War II. After the war, she became a training ship until the ship was decommissioned in 1958 and broken up two years later.

Background and design
The State Duma had earlier approved construction of modern dreadnought battleships, but the IRN lacked modern cruisers and destroyers. Several years after the first s were ordered, the navy finally gained approval for four light cruisers as part of the 1912–1916 shipbuilding program to scout for the capital ships and to lead destroyer flotillas. Design work for the ships had begun as back as 1907, but it took the IRN several iterations between alternating specifications and designs to decide what was feasible. Other important requirements were a strong resemblance to the dreadnoughts under construction and the ability to lay mines. None of the submissions were entirely satisfactory, and the shipyards were asked for new, larger, designs. The navy combined the submissions from the Russo-Baltic and Putilov Shipyards for a  design in November. Late changes to the design, including the addition of Frahm anti-roll tanks and provision for a seaplane, added several hundred extra tons to the displacement.

The ships displaced  at normal load. They were powered by four direct-drive Curtis-AEG-Vulkan steam turbines, each driving one propeller shaft, using steam provided by 13 Yarrow boilers. The turbines were designed to produce , which would propel the ship at 29.5 knots; those for Svetlana and Admiral Greig were ordered from AG Vulcan Stettin in Germany (Admiral Greig subcontracted to Blohm+Voss). These were not delivered owing to the outbreak of World War I, and those intended for Svetlana were used to engine the German Brummer-class cruisers. As a result, new engines had to be ordered from the UK; this delayed Svetlana, and probably prevented Greigs completion as a cruiser. The ships carried  of fuel oil. Their crew consisted of approximately 630 officers and crewmen.

The increase in size of the Svetlanas during the design process allowed their main armament to be increased from 12 to 15 Pattern 1913 guns in single mounts. Six of the 10 guns on the main deck were positioned in casemates and all were difficult to work in bad weather. The maximum rate of fire was eight rounds per minute. The ships were also armed with four 38-caliber  anti-aircraft (AA) guns, although their maximum elevation was limited to +75°, two submerged  torpedo tubes and could carry 100 mines. During construction, Svetlanas AA guns were replaced by 30-caliber  Lender AA guns and the rest of the ships were intended to receive  AA guns.

The waterline belt of the Svetlana-class ships was 76 millimeters thick. Above it was a  strake of armor that covered the area between the lower and main decks. The walls of the conning tower were 76 millimeters thick while the gun shields protecting the 130-millimeter guns were 25 millimeters thick.

Ships

ServiceSvetlana and her sister ships were evacuated to Petrograd when the Germans approached Reval in late 1917 and were laid up incomplete during the Russian Revolution. The Soviets renamed Svetlana as Profintern in 1922, and removed her original torpedo tubes in exchange for a pair of triple  torpedo tubes on the main deck. The ship was completed in 1925, although she required several more years' work to be fully operational. Initially assigned to the Baltic Fleet, Profintern was transferred to the Black Sea Fleet in 1929. She was extensively overhauled in the late 1930s and her anti-aircraft armament was greatly augmented. The ship was renamed Krasnyi Krym upon the completion of her overhaul in 1939. During World War II, she supported Soviet troops during the Siege of Odessa, the Siege of Sevastopol, and the Kerch-Feodosiya Operation in the winter of 1941–1942. The ship was reclassified as a training ship in 1945 and was decommissioned in 1958 before being scrapped in 1960.Admiral Spiridov and Admiral Greig were converted into diesel-powered oil tankers during the 1920s and were renamed Grozneft and Azneft respectively. They were subsequently transferred to the Black Sea where the latter ship parted her moorings during a storm in Tuapse on 23 December 1938. She was blown onto a mole and capsized. Grozneft was renamed Groznyy in 1935 and was captured by the Germans on 8 October 1941. The ship was scuttled at Mariupol on 20 September 1943 and was refloated after the war. Groznyy was transferred back to the Baltic in 1946. Admiral Butakov was renamed Voroshilov'' in 1928, but was never completed. Her hull was used as a breakwater at the mouth of the Neva River at Saint Petersburg before being broken up in 1952.

Notes

References
 
 

 
 

 

Cruiser classes
 
Cruisers of the Imperial Russian Navy